Yasuhiro Enoki (born May 22, 1972) is a former baseball player from Japan.  He played for the Chiba Lotte Marines in the Pacific League.

References

1972 births
Living people
Japanese expatriate baseball players in the United States
Nippon Professional Baseball pitchers
Lotte Orions players
Chiba Lotte Marines players
Visalia Oaks players
Yomiuri Giants players